Ali Cyrus Ehsassi  (‎; born April 24, 1970) is a Canadian politician currently serving as a Liberal Member of Parliament for Willowdale, Ontario riding of Willowdale in the House of Commons of Canada in the 2015 federal election. Ehsassi's victory marked a historical milestone, as he is one of the first two Canadians of Iranian heritage to ever be elected to Canada's federal Parliament, with the other being Majid Jowhari.

Biography

Ali was born on April 24, 1970 in Geneva, Switzerland. At the age of three, his family relocated to New York City and by age 15, Ali moved to North York, Ontario with his family.

Ali's extended family has extensive experience in international relations. Ali's maternal great-grandfather was Iranian statesman Abdolhossein Teymourtash, who was the first Minister of Court during the Pahlavi dynasty. Ehsassi's father was also an Iranian diplomat and works in Iran's embassy at Switzerland when he was born. His family left Iran during the Iranian Revolution

Education

Ehsassi holds a Bachelor of Arts degree from the University of Toronto and a Master's of Science degree from the London School of Economics . He attended York University Osgoode Hall Law School having obtained his LL.B.   Ehsassi then went on to Georgetown University Law School to pursue a masters of international trade and arbitration law, which he attended concurrently as a global and WTO fellow.

Member of Parliament

Ali Ehsassi was elected in 2015 as the Liberal representative for Willowdale. Ali has been active in both his riding and in Ottawa, and is a member of the Standing Committee on Justice and Human Rights.

Ali is the chair of the All-Party Parliamentary Group for the Prevention of Genocide and other Crimes against Humanity, Co-Chair of the 416 Caucus, is on the Standing Committee for Citizenship and Immigration, and the Standing Joint Committee for the Scrutiny of Regulations.

Ehsassi is also a member of several Parliamentary Associations and Interparliamentary groups such as the Canada-Africa Parliamentary Association, Canada-China Legislative Association
Canada-Israel Interparliamentary Group, Canada-United Kingdom Inter-Parliamentary Association, Canada-United States Inter-Parliamentary Group, Canadian Group of the Inter-Parliamentary Union, Canadian NATO Parliamentary Association and the Canadian Section of ParlAmericas.

Advocacy for human rights

In 2015, Ehsassi supported Justin Trudeau's positive stance on the Iran Nuclear Deal and stated that Iran should be held to account for its abysmal human rights record and refrain from supporting international terrorism.

Electoral record

References

External links
 Official Website

1970 births
Living people
Osgoode Hall Law School alumni
Georgetown University Law Center alumni
Liberal Party of Canada MPs
Members of the House of Commons of Canada from Ontario
Lawyers in Ontario
People from North York
Politicians from Toronto
Canadian people of Iranian descent
Canadian politicians of Iranian descent
Canadian Muslims
Alumni of the London School of Economics
Swiss emigrants to Canada
21st-century Canadian politicians